Vi flyr på Rio (We're Flying to Rio) is a Swedish–Norwegian drama film from 1949.

Plot
When captain Curt Åhs comes home one day, he discovers that his wife has been unfaithful. Curt gets to know the flight attendant Berit. They experience adventure together during a flight to Rio de Janeiro.

Background and reception
The film had its Norwegian premiere on November 17, 1949 and was about Scandinavian Airlines' long-haul flights on the new route to South America. The film included an authentic crash scene, which was originally shown in the Swedish film Ungdom av idag (Youth of Today). The critics gave the film mixed reviews. On the one hand, they one praised the actors but, on the other hand, they considered the story to sometimes be hackneyed and lacking depth.

Cast
 Åke Ohberg as Curt Åhs, the captain
 Inger Juel as Karin Åhs, his wife
 Lars Nordrum as Frans Hauge, the pilot
 Per Oscarsson as Helmer Wallberg, the co-pilot
 Margareta Fahlén as Berit Thorsson, a stewardess (Swedish version)
 Helen Brinchmann as Berit Thorsson, a stewardess (Norwegian version)
 Urda Arneberg as Li Arnessen, a stewardess
 Lauritz Falk as Eyvind Lynge, the radio man
 Åke Söderblom as Fridolf, the mechanic
 Henki Kolstad as Bonzo, the purser
 Sonja Wigert as Irene Gruwe
 Brita Bigum as the English-speaking cabaret singer

References

External links 
 
 Vi flyr på Rio at the National Library of Norway
 Vi flyr på Rio at Filmfront

1949 films
1940s Norwegian-language films
1940s Swedish-language films
Norwegian drama films
Swedish drama films
Films directed by Åke Ohberg
1940s multilingual films
Norwegian multilingual films
Swedish multilingual films
1940s Swedish films